Branislav Mráz (born 13 July 1973) is a Slovak football manager and former player.

External links
 at eurofotbal.cz

References

1973 births
Living people
Sportspeople from Malacky
Slovak footballers
Slovak football managers
Association football defenders
FK Senica players
FK Dubnica players
MŠK Rimavská Sobota players
Slovak Super Liga players
MŠK Rimavská Sobota managers
FC Spartak Trnava managers
FC ViOn Zlaté Moravce managers
2. Liga (Slovakia) managers
Slovak Super Liga managers